Ronald Reagan Parkway (RRP) is a controlled-access highway located in the northeastern part of the Atlanta metropolitan area in the U.S. state of Georgia. Its route is entirely within the south-central portion of Gwinnett County, connecting the Lilburn area with Snellville. It is named after Ronald Reagan, the 40th president. The highway was spearheaded by then-Gwinnett County chairman Wayne Mason in the mid-1990s.

Route description
The parkway begins at an intersection with Pleasant Hill Road, northeast of Lilburn. It passes just north of Browne Lake and has an interchange with U.S. Route 29 (US 29) and State Route 8 (SR 8; Lawrenceville Highway). On the northeast side of Bethesda Park is an interchange with Bethesda Church Road, which partially travels through the park. After crossing over the Yellow River, it curves to the southeast and has an interchange with Five Forks–Trickum Road. Then, it meets Webb Gin House Road SW and passes to the west of Eastside Medical Center. At Presidential Circle, the freeway portion of the parkway ends and it continues to the southeast at-grade. Approximately  later, the parkway intersects SR 124 (Scenic Highway SW). Here, the roadway continues to the southeast as Pinehurst Road SW.

All of Ronald Reagan Parkway is included as part of the National Highway System, a system of roadways important to the nation's economy, defense, and mobility.

History
The parkway was established in 1995 along the same alignment it runs today. For a short period of time, the parkway had an unsigned designation of State Route 864 (SR 864), even though it is considered a county road.

In 2009, new plans were developed to extend Ronald Reagan Parkway as a toll road to directly connect with I-85. On June 23, 2009, Gwinnett County voted to approve a partnership with a private firm to study extending the Ronald Reagan Parkway to I-85. The study cost $1.4 million and was funded by the County. The plans were abandoned in February 2013 due to public concerns about tolls, potential traffic and the road path.

Exit list

See also

References

External links

Transportation in Gwinnett County, Georgia
Monuments and memorials to Ronald Reagan
Parkways in the United States